Racy may refer to:

 Racy, West Virginia
 An unincorporated community in Chapin Township, Michigan
 Racy (album)
 Mridula Ahmed Racy, Bangladeshi actress, businessperson and television anchor

See also
 Racey (disambiguation)